Vikram Seth's second non-fiction work, Two Lives, is the story of a century and of a love affair across an ethnic divide. As the name suggests, it is a story of two extraordinary lives, that of his great uncle, Shanti Behari Seth, and of his German Jewish great aunt, Hennerle Gerda Caro.

Two Lives is divided into five parts, beginning with the teenage author going to live with his uncle and aunt in England for higher studies at the Tonbridge School. His first year is followed by intense travel in Europe. After completing his A-levels, Seth moves on to continue his education at Oxford and Stanford, all the while remaining in contact with his guardian uncle and aunt.

The story delves intricately into the ups and downs of the lives of his uncle and aunt. The text is frequently interspersed with photographs, letters, anecdotes based on Shanti’s interviews with the author, and other sources.

It won the 2006 Vodafone Crossword Book Award.

External links
 Review by Antony Beevor, Times Online, September 3, 2005 (Retrieved on 2013-10-18)
 Togetherness, once removed, The Observer, September 11, 2005 (Retrieved on 2008-10-08)
 Review, The Guardian, 17 September 2005 (Retrieved on 2008-10-08)

Biographies (books)
Books by Vikram Seth
Little, Brown and Company books
2005 non-fiction books